Amandina Lihamba (born 1944) is a Tanzanian academic, actress, playwright and theatre director. She is a professor at the University of Dar es Salaam in the Department of Fine and Performing Arts and has served as its dean, head of department, and university council member. In 1989, she co-founded the national Children Theatre Project and festival. She also founded the girls drama group Tuseme (Let's Speak Out) festival with Penina Muhando in 1998.

Lihambra was born in Morogoro District, Tanzania in 1944. She earned her Ph.D. from the University of Leeds. Her 1985 doctoral dissertation focussed on "Politics and Theatre in Tanzania after the Arusha Declaration 1967–1984". There, she describes how after the Arusha Declaration the Tanzanian verse drama ngonjera evolved from a propaganda tool of the ruling party into a subversive and syncretic form.

Apart from plays and children's books, Lihamba also wrote Hawala ya fedha, based on Senegalese film director Ousmane Sembène's The Money-Order.

Plays 

 Harakati za ukombozi (2003)
 Hawala ya fedha (2004)

Fiction for young readers 

 Mkutano wa pili wa ndege (1992)
 Nana, Upepo mwanana (1999)

Filmography as actress or writer
The Marriage of Mariamu (1985)
Khalfan and Zanzibar (1999)
Maangamizi: The Ancient One (2001)

References

1944 births
Living people
Alumni of the University of Leeds
Tanzanian actresses
Tanzanian dramatists and playwrights
Tanzanian film directors
Tanzanian women film directors
Tanzanian women writers
Academic staff of the University of Dar es Salaam
20th-century Tanzanian actresses
21st-century Tanzanian actresses